Major-General Sir Fitzroy Hew Royle Maclean, 1st Baronet,  (11 March 1911 – 15 June 1996) was a Scottish soldier, writer and politician. He was a Unionist Member of Parliament (MP) from 1941 to 1974 and was one of only two men who during the Second World War enlisted in the British Army as a private and rose to the rank of brigadier, the other being future fellow Conservative MP Enoch Powell.

Maclean wrote several books, including Eastern Approaches, in which he recounted three extraordinary series of adventures: travelling, often incognito, in Soviet Central Asia; fighting in the Western Desert campaign, where he specialised in commando raids behind enemy lines; and living rough with Josip Broz Tito and his Yugoslav Partisans while commanding the Maclean Mission there. It has been widely speculated that Ian Fleming used Maclean as one of his inspirations for James Bond.

Early life
Maclean was born in Cairo to Major Charles Wilberforce Maclean QOCH (1875–1953), a member of the Scottish landed gentry serving in Egypt with the Queen's Own Cameron Highlanders, and Frances Elaine Gladys Royle (12 June 1882 – 1954), the only daughter of George Royle, a Royal Navy officer, and Fannie Jane Longueville Snow. The couple wed on 12 July 1905 at St George's Parish, Hanover Square, Middlesex, London.

Heritage and education

He was descended from the Macleans of Ardgour, a Sept of the Clan Maclean, whose chiefs have as their historic seat Duart Castle on the Isle of Mull in the Inner Hebrides. He was brought up in Italy and educated at Eton and King's College, Cambridge, where he read Classics and History. He then studied in Germany before joining the Diplomatic Service in 1933.

In the Soviet Union

In 1934 Fitzroy Maclean was posted to the British Embassy in Paris. Bored with the pleasant but undemanding routine, he requested a posting to Moscow in 1937. The two and a half years he spent in the Soviet Union formed the first third of his best known book, the autobiographical Eastern Approaches.

Maclean was in Moscow until late 1939, and was present during the great Stalinist purges, observing the fates of Bukharin and other Russian revolutionaries. Although he was stationed in the capital, Maclean travelled extensively, primarily by train, into remote regions of the USSR which were off limits to foreigners, and was shadowed by the NKVD as he did so.

World War II

When war broke out in 1939 Maclean was prevented from joining the military because of his position as a diplomat. He was 2nd Secretary in the Foreign Office. Therefore, he resigned from the Diplomatic Service "to go into politics". After tendering his resignation he immediately took a taxi to the nearest recruiting office and enlisted as a Private in the Queen's Own Cameron Highlanders. He was soon promoted to lance corporal and was commissioned in 1941. In that year he became the Conservative MP for Lancaster.

In North Africa in 1942, he distinguished himself in the early actions of the newly formed Special Air Service (SAS), where, with Ralph A. Bagnold, he developed ways of driving vehicles over the Libyan sand "seas". Maclean was a brilliant practitioner in the T. E. Lawrence brand of fighting, and he reported directly to Winston Churchill in Cairo. A letter of introduction from David Stirling said of him at the end of this period: "He has done well on our raids. Don't be taken in by his rather pompous manner or his slow way of speaking - he is OK."

Persia and Iraq
Later that year he transferred to the Middle East as part of the Persia and Iraq Command. He was "allotted a platoon of Seaforth Highlanders and instructed to kidnap" General Fazlollah Zahedi, the commander of the Persian forces in the Isfahan area. Maclean captured him and smuggled him out by plane to internment in Palestine. This incident soon led Hitler's government to withdraw support from its network in Persia.

Yugoslavia

Churchill chose him to lead a liaison mission (Macmis) to central Yugoslavia in 1943. Josip Broz Tito and his Partisans were emerging as a major obstacle to German control of the Balkans. Little was known at the time about Tito: some suspected this was an acronym for a committee or that he might in fact be a young woman. Maclean got to know Tito well, and later produced two biographies of him. Maclean's relationship with Tito's Partisans was not always easy, partly because they were Communist, while he came from an upper class Scottish background, and had witnessed Stalinism in action (see above).

As Churchill personally told him, Maclean's mission was not to concern himself with how Yugoslavia was to be run after the war, but "simply to find out who was killing the most Germans and suggest means by which we could help them to kill more."

In the late summer of 1944, together with Tito, he planned and implemented Operation Ratweek.  It was a major Allied bombing campaign in collaboration with the local Partisan troops in order to prevent German troops retreating back and reinforcing those in central and western Europe, thus prolonging the war.

His biography of Tito reveals the admiration he held for the Yugoslav leader and the Yugoslav Communist-led anti-fascist struggle. He developed a great affection for Yugoslavia and its people and was later given permission to buy a house on the Dalmatian island of Korčula, Croatia.

Having been appointed a Commander of the Order of the British Empire (CBE) in 1944, he received the Order of Kutuzov (Soviet Union) (which impressed the Soviet troops in Belgrade), and after the war the Croix de Guerre (France), and Order of the Partisan Star (Yugoslavia). He reached the rank of Brigadier during the war, and was promoted to the local rank of Major General on 16 June 1947.

Later life

Maclean was elected as Conservative Member of Parliament (MP) for Lancaster in the 1941 by-election. He was re-elected from Lancaster in 1945, 1950, 1951, and 1955. He served briefly as a junior minister at the War Office from 1954 to 1957. Harold Macmillan regretted losing him, "but he is really so hopeless in the House that he is a passenger in office ... a great pity, since he is so able."

On 9 July 1949, Maclean laid the foundation stone of the Overton & District Memorial Hall in his Lancaster constituency. He had been President of the committee that had raised the money to purchase the land and build it.

In the 1959 general election he switched constituencies to Bute and North Ayrshire, where he was elected as a Unionist. He was re-elected as a Unionist in 1964, and as a Conservative in 1966 and 1970. He retired at the February 1974 general election. In his last two years, he was appointed as a member of the Parliamentary Assembly of the Council of Europe and Western European Union.

Maclean was Executive Chair (1959-1970) and later President (1977-1987) of the GB-USSR Association. The Association, funded by the Foreign and Commonwealth Office [FCO], was a semi-official organization for cultural relations with the Soviet Union.

Marriage
He married Veronica Nell Fraser-Phipps (1920–2005), a Roman Catholic, in 1946. She was the daughter of the 16th Lord Lovat and widow of naval hero Lt. Alan Phipps, who was killed ashore at Leros in 1943. Sir Fitzroy and Lady Maclean had two sons: Charles Edward (born 1946) and Alexander James Simon Aeneas ("Jamie"; born 1949), who were brought up in their mother's faith. Charles is an author, well known for dark thrillers, including the cult classic The Watcher. Jamie became an art dealer and founded the Erotic Review.

Maclean was also stepfather to his wife's children from her first marriage, Susan Rose "Sukie" Phipps (born 1941) and Jeremy Julian Phipps (born 1942), who were not brought up Catholic. Sukie married Richard St. Clair de la Mare, grandson of poet Walter de la Mare in 1959, then writer Derek Marlowe in 1968, and finally Captain Nicolas Paravicini in 1986. She had five children, and is stepmother to autistic savant Derek Paravicini. Jeremy became a Major General in the Army, having served in the SAS.

Honours
Sir Fitzroy was honoured with the baronetcy of Maclean of Strachur and Glensluain in 1957, was made the 15th Hereditary Keeper and Captain of Dunconnel Castle in 1981 and was made a knight of the Most Ancient and Most Noble Order of the Thistle in 1994.

In retirement Maclean wrote extensively. His wide range of subjects included: Scottish history, biographies (including Tito and Burgess), a Russian trilogy and assorted works of fiction. He also contributed to other books, for example writing the foreword to a 1984 biography of Joseph Wolff, the so-called "Eccentric Missionary" in whose footsteps he had travelled to Bukhara almost half a century before.

Maclean and his wife managed a hotel at Strachur. In 1964 he commissioned his wartime friend, fellow commando and yacht designer Alfred Mylne II, to build the motor yacht Judi of Bute for use around the West Coast of Scotland. Maclean was a patron of Strachur and District Shinty Club. He collected an extensive library, including a full set of early editions of James Bond novels, which sold in September 2008 for £26,000.

In the late 1960s, Maclean bought the Palazzo Boschi villa on the Adriatic island of Korčula (present-day Croatia), where he spent a good part of each year.

Yugoslav legislation at the time barred foreigners from buying real-estate property, but Tito intervened to allow Maclean to do so. The town of Korčula was declared a free city, and the Macleans were declared its citizens. As soon as the purchase was registered with city authorities, the free city status was revoked.

In 1991, during the Croatian War of Independence, Maclean and his wife delivered medical supplies to the island of Korčula, with a substantial contribution from the people of Rothesay and Bute.

Death
Sir Fitzroy Maclean died on 15 June 1996, aged 85, in Hertford, Hertfordshire, England.

Legacy
Maclean was posthumously awarded the Order of Prince Branimir for the humanitarian aid to Croatia, as well as contributing to international affirmation of Croatia. The decoration was presented by the Croatian President Stjepan Mesić in December 2001.

Maclean may have been one of the models for Ian Fleming's character James Bond.

Styles and honours
 Fitzroy Maclean, Esq (1911–41)
 Fitzroy Maclean, Esq (1941–44) MP
 Fitzroy Maclean, Esq, CBE, MP (1944–57)
 Sir Fitzroy Maclean of Strachur and Glensluian, Bt, CBE, MP (1957–74)
 Sir Fitzroy Maclean of Strachur and Glensluian, Bt, CBE (1974–81)
 Sir Fitzroy Maclean of Dunconnel, Bt, CBE (1981–94)
 Sir Fitzroy Maclean of Dunconnel, Bt, KT, CBE (1994–96)

Posts held
 Member of Parliament for Lancaster (1941–59)
 Parliamentary Undersecretary of State for War (1954–1957)
 Member of Parliament for Bute and Northern Ayrshire (1959–74)
 President, GB-USSR Association (1977-1987)

Bibliography
 Eastern Approaches, 1949
  Also published as Disputed Barricade: the life and times of Josip Broz-Tito, Marshal of Yugoslavia, 1957
 A Person from England and Other Travellers, 1958
 Back to Bokhara, 1959
 Yugoslavia, 1969
 Concise History of Scotland, 1970
 The Battle of Neretva, 1970
 The Back of Beyond: an illustrated companion to Central Asia and Mongolia, 1974
 To Causasus, 1976
 Holy Russia, 1978
 Take Nine Spies, 1978
 Tito, 1980
 Josip Broz Tito: A Pictorial Biography, 1980 
 The Isles of the Sea, 1985
 Portrait of the Soviet Union, 1988
 Bonnie Prince Charlie, 1988
 All the Russias, 1992
 Highlanders: A History of the Scottish Clans, 1995

Biographies
 Maclean, Veronica (2002) Past Forgetting: a memoir of heroes, adventure, love and life with Fitzroy Maclean. London: Review .
 McLynn, Frank (1992) Fitzroy Maclean. London: John Murray .

See also
 Special Operations Executive
 Balkan Air Force
 Yugoslav Partisans

References

External links 

 
 Sir Fitzroy, the original James Bond, is dead
 Scots adventurer was never a spy, reveals widow
 Fitzroy Maclean, War Hero And Author, Is Dead at 85
 Local obituary - Veronica, Lady Maclean.  Information on the latter part of his life, including running the Highland hotel.
 Times obituary of Veronica Lady Maclean. "Well-connected writer, traveller, restaurateur and devotee of the Scottish Highlands and Yugoslavia." On their marriage.
 "I wish you could think of grown-up sins." Allan Massie reviews Past Forgetting by Veronica Maclean.
 A Guide to the Papers of Sir Fitzroy Maclean, 1827-1996 Maclean's family and personal papers are held at the Albert and Shirley Small Special Collections Library of the University of Virginia
 

1911 births
1996 deaths
Scottish diplomats
British Army brigadiers of World War II
Historians of World War II
Queen's Own Cameron Highlanders officers
Queen's Own Cameron Highlanders soldiers
Special Air Service officers
British Army generals
Knights of the Thistle
Commanders of the Order of the British Empire
Baronets in the Baronetage of the United Kingdom
Recipients of the Croix de Guerre 1939–1945 (France)
Recipients of the Order of Kutuzov
20th-century Scottish writers
Writers about the Soviet Union
Alumni of King's College, Cambridge
Fitzroy
People educated at Eton College
Unionist Party (Scotland) MPs
Conservative Party (UK) MPs for English constituencies
UK MPs 1935–1945
UK MPs 1945–1950
UK MPs 1950–1951
UK MPs 1951–1955
UK MPs 1955–1959
UK MPs 1959–1964
UK MPs 1964–1966
UK MPs 1966–1970
UK MPs 1970–1974
Scottish Conservative Party MPs
Scottish generals
20th-century Scottish historians
Ministers in the Eden government, 1955–1957